The Premio Ambrosiano is a Group 3 flat horse race in Italy open to thoroughbreds aged four years or older. It is run over a distance of 2,000 metres (about 1¼ miles) at Milan in April.

History
The event was formerly open to horses aged three or older. For a period it held Group 3 status. It was closed to three-year-olds in 1988, and downgraded to Listed level in 1996.

The race was promoted back to Group 3 in 2007.

Records
Most successful horse since 1987 (2 wins):
 Altieri – 2004, 2005
 Orpello - 2013, 2014

Leading jockey since 1987 (5 wins):
 Fabio Branca – Jakkalberry (2010), Saratoga Black (2012), Orpello (2013, 2014), Circus Couture (2016)

Leading trainer since 1987 (4 wins):

 Stefano Botti - Orpello (2013, 2014), Circus Couture (2016), Voice Of Love (2017)

Winners since 1987

See also
 List of Italian flat horse races

References

 Racing Post / www.labronica.it:
 , 1999, 2001, 

 galopp-sieger.de – Premio Ambrosiano.
 horseracingintfed.com – International Federation of Horseracing Authorities – Premio Ambrosiano (2017).
 pedigreequery.com – Premio Ambrosiano – Milano San Siro.

Open middle distance horse races
Sport in Milan
Horse races in Italy